Tirrell Mountain is a mountain located in Adirondack Mountains of New York located in the Town of Indian Lake east-northeast of Blue Mountain Lake. Tirrel Pond is located southeast, Dun Brook Mountain is located east, and Tongue Mountain is located northeast of Tirrell Mountain.

References

Mountains of Hamilton County, New York
Mountains of New York (state)